Petra Margareta Ekerum (born 1980) is a Swedish politician and former member of the Riksdag, the national legislature. A member of the Social Democratic Party, she represented Västra Götaland County West between January 2017 and September 2018.

References

1980 births
21st-century Swedish women politicians
Living people
Members of the Riksdag 2014–2018
Members of the Riksdag from the Social Democrats
Women members of the Riksdag